Kwak Tae-hwi (or ; born 8 July 1981) is a former South Korean football player. He was blind in his left eye since his youth, but became a centre-back of the South Korea national football team.

Career statistics

International

Scores and results list South Korea's goal tally first.

Honours
FC Seoul
K League 1: 2016
Korean League Cup: 2006
Korean FA Cup runner-up: 2016

Jeonnam Dragons
Korean FA Cup: 2007
Korean League Cup runner-up: 2008

Ulsan Hyundai
AFC Champions League: 2012
Korean League Cup: 2011

Al–Shabab
King Cup runner-up: 2013

Al-Hilal
King Cup: 2015
Saudi Crown Prince Cup: 2015–16
Saudi Super Cup: 2015
AFC Champions League runner-up: 2014

South Korea
AFC Asian Cup runner-up: 2015
EAFF Championship: 2008

Individual
K League 1 Best XI: 2011, 2012
AFC Champions League Dream Team: 2014
AFC Asian Cup Team of the Tournament: 2015
AFC Champions League All-Star Squad: 2016
Korean FA Fans' Defender of the Year: 2016

References

External links
 
 Kwak Tae-hwi at KFA
 
 
 

1981 births
Living people
Sportspeople from Daegu
South Korean footballers
Chung-Ang University alumni
Association football defenders
South Korean expatriate footballers
South Korea international footballers
FC Seoul players
Jeonnam Dragons players
Kyoto Sanga FC players
Ulsan Hyundai FC players
Al-Shabab FC (Riyadh) players
Al Hilal SFC players
Gyeongnam FC players
K League 1 players
J1 League players
J2 League players
2011 AFC Asian Cup players
2014 FIFA World Cup players
2015 AFC Asian Cup players
Expatriate footballers in Japan
Expatriate footballers in Saudi Arabia
South Korean expatriate sportspeople in Japan
South Korean expatriate sportspeople in Saudi Arabia
Sportspeople with a vision impairment
Saudi Professional League players
South Korean blind people